Trina (born 1978) is an American rapper.

Trina may also refer to:

Trina (butterfly)
Trina (name)
Trina (wrestler)
Trina & Tamara American contemporary R&B group from Gary, Indiana who were active in the late 1990s
Cyclone Trina

See also

 
 
 Trina Solar, a Chinese manufacturer of photovoltaic modules
Katrina (disambiguation)